Peter and John is a 2015 American drama film written and directed by Jay Craven and starring Jacqueline Bisset and Christian Coulson.  It is based on Guy de Maupassant's novel Pierre et Jean.

Plot

Cast
Jacqueline Bisset
Christian Coulson as Peter Roland
Diane Guerrero as Lucia
Shane Patrick Kearns as John Roland
Gordon Clapp as Charles Roland
Gary Farmer as Smoke

Production
The film was shot in Nantucket.

Nomination
The film was nominated for a 2016 New England Emmy Award.

References

External links
 
 

American drama films
Films shot in Massachusetts
Films based on French novels
Films based on works by Guy de Maupassant
2010s English-language films
2010s American films
2015 drama films